W. poeppigii may refer to:

 Wettinia poeppigii, a monoecious palm
 Wittmackia poeppigii, a plant native to the West Indies, Costa Rica, Panama, and northern South America